Lee Yu-Wen (born December 21, 1980) is a Singaporean bowler.

Sports career 
Lee started bowling when he was 14 years old, and was selected to join the national team in April 2001. His first major tournament was the 2001 SEA Games, where he won a bronze medal in the Trios event. Upon his return, he won the Cathay Bowl Junior Classic and dedicated his win to his father who had died weeks earlier. Lee then went on to win the Champion of Champions title.

His run continued into 2002 with a victory at the Vietnam Open. Lee then hit his career high, winning a Gold medal for Trios (with Remy Ong and Sam Goh) at the 14th Asian Games.

Since then he has won the prestigious Qatar Open (2005) (with a cash prize of US$40000) as well as the 39th edition of the Singapore Open (2006).

Although that meant the start of a 3-year title drought, but he emerged once more at the 40th Singapore National Championship as Champion over Remy Ong in 2009.

Other pursuits 
In addition to his love of all sports, Lee's other passions include singing and dancing. He was a cast member in The Toy Factory's productions of Army Daze and Spring Singing.

References

Living people
1980 births
Singaporean ten-pin bowling players
Singaporean sportspeople of Chinese descent
Asian Games medalists in bowling
Bowlers at the 2006 Asian Games
Bowlers at the 2002 Asian Games
Asian Games gold medalists for Singapore
Asian Games silver medalists for Singapore
Medalists at the 2006 Asian Games
Medalists at the 2002 Asian Games
Southeast Asian Games bronze medalists for Singapore
Southeast Asian Games medalists in bowling
Competitors at the 2001 Southeast Asian Games